The White Drin Waterfall is a waterfall in the western part of Kosovo. It is located in the Zhleb mountain in the Bjeshkët e Nemuna in the village of Radavc,  11 km away from the town of Peja. Mountainous scenery surrounds the waterfall and makes it a popular tourist attraction throughout Kosovo. Other smaller waterfalls are near the area. 

Notes

References 

Waterfalls of Kosovo
Accursed Mountains